

List of Ambassadors

Yacov Hadas-Handelsman, December 2019 – present
Yossi Amrani 2016 - 2019 
Ilan Mor 2011 - 2016
Aliza Bin-Noun 2007 - 2011
David Admon  2004 - 2007
Judith Varnai-Shorer 2000 - 2004
Joel Alon 1994 - 2000
David Kraus 1991 - 1994
Yudith Hiebner 1983-1987
Ambassador Slomo Marom 1989 - 1991
Chargé d'Affaires a.i. David Giladi
Minister Yerachmiel Ram Yaron 1958 - 1960
Chargé d'Affaires a.i. Lou-Lea Kaddar
Chargé d'Affaires a.i. Dov Sattath
Chargé d'Affaires a.i. Katriel Katz
Chargé d'Affaires a.i. Avner Gershon
Minister Meir Touval  1956
Minister Shmuel Bentzur  1951 - 1952
Minister Shmoel Elyashiv (Non-Resident, Prague) 1950 - 1951
Minister Ehud Avriel (Non-Resident, Prague) 1948 - 1950

References 

Hungary
Israel